Sir Mark Aubrey Weinberg (born 9 August 1931) is a South African-born British financier. He is the Life President of St. James’s Place Wealth Management.

Early life and education
Weinberg was born in South Africa and educated at King Edward VII School in Johannesburg. He received degrees in commerce and law from University of Witwatersrand, Johannesburg, South Africa and practised as a barrister. He later received his Master of Laws at the London School of Economics, specialising in company law, and wrote the book Takeovers and Mergers whilst there.

Financial services career
In 1961, he founded Abbey Life Assurance Company in London,[1] which was one of the first companies to develop unit-linked assurance and where he formed one of the UK’s first retail property funds.

In 1971, he went on to found Hambro Life Assurance, subsequently called Allied Dunbar,[1] where he was managing director until 1983 (it is now part of Zurich Financial Services), operating in the insurance broker market as well as building up a sales force. There he formed the first retail managed fund and originated the concept of the variable premium whole life policy.

He was knighted in the 1987 New Year's Honours List.[2]

With the late Mike Wilson and Lord Rothschild, he co-founded J. Rothschild Assurance, which became St. James’s Place Wealth Management, and was the second fastest company to join the FTSE 100.

Additionally, from its founding in 2005 until 2016, he was the chairman of the Pension Insurance Corporation,[6]a company set up to provide insurance solutions for pension scheme management, in particular for defined benefit corporate pension schemes.

Other activities

He was deputy chairman of the principal UK regulatory body, the Securities and Investment Board,[1] from its inception in 1985 until 1990, having been an adviser on insurance affairs to the Secretary of State for Trade and Industry.

He is also the author of Weinberg and Blank on Take-overs and Mergers (1962), the standard legal textbook on the subject, now in its fifth edition (1989),[7] which he wrote with Victor Blank.

He was the co-founder of the Per Cent Club,[1] a grouping of top companies committed to increasing companies’ charitable and community contributions, and deputy chairman of Business in the Community.[1]

From 1983 to 1991 he was the honorary treasurer of the National Society for the Prevention of Cruelty to Children[1] and from 1985 to 1992 was a trustee of the Tate Gallery.[1]

He is an honorary bencher of Gray's Inn and is a governor emeritus of the London School of Economics.

In 2013 he underwrote the development of CAERvest,[8] a unique human cooling device that is used to treat heatstroke.  He is also the non-executive chairman of Atlas City, a newly established company in the field of blockchain and of Blackout, a company which has developed a unique system for protecting data in the care of companies, as well as enabling schools to limit the use of social media by their pupils.

Family
He is married to former actress, hotelier and designer Anouska Hempel, his second wife, and has 4 children.

References

1931 births
Living people
British businesspeople
English Jews
Knights Bachelor
Alumni of the London School of Economics
South African emigrants to the United Kingdom
National Society for the Prevention of Cruelty to Children people